Paul Vallé (31 December 1926 – 29 December 2004) was a British sprinter. He competed in the men's 200 metres at the 1948 Summer Olympics.

Competition record

References

External links

1926 births
2004 deaths
Athletes (track and field) at the 1948 Summer Olympics
British male sprinters
Olympic athletes of Great Britain
Place of birth missing